Methylhippuric acid is a carboxylic acid and organic compound. Methylhippuric acid has three isomers. The isomers include 2-, 3-, and 4-methylhippuric acid.

Methylhippuric acids are metabolites of the isomers of xylene.  The presence of methylhippuric acid can be used as a biomarker to determine exposure to xylene.

See also
 Hippuric acid

References

Carboxylic acids
Benzamides
Human metabolites